Christoph Spycher (born 30 March 1978) is Swiss former professional footballer who played as a left-back. Spycher is chief sports officer of BSC Young Boys.

Career
Born in Wolhusen, Spycher played for Eintracht Frankfurt in the Bundesliga for five years, mainly as a full-back.

He had a trial with Rangers FC in June 2004.

In the 2007–08 season he was vice captain at Eintracht. He was appointed captain of the team in July 2009. In May 2010, it was reported that he joined BSC Young Boys.

International career
He represented the national team at 2008 UEFA Euro, where the team showed good performance in the tournament, achieving the best result at the time.

On 18 May 2010, Spycher was forced to pull out of Switzerland's 2010 FIFA World Cup squad because of a knee injury and also retired from international football.

Honours
Grasshopper Club Zürich
Nationalliga A: 2002–03

Eintracht Frankfurt	
 DFB-Pokal runner-up: 2005–06

References

External links
 Christoph Spycher at eintracht-archiv.de
 
 

1978 births
Living people
Swiss men's footballers
Switzerland international footballers
Swiss expatriate footballers
Association football fullbacks
Swiss Super League players
Bundesliga players
FC Luzern players
Grasshopper Club Zürich players
Eintracht Frankfurt players
BSC Young Boys players
UEFA Euro 2004 players
2006 FIFA World Cup players
UEFA Euro 2008 players
Expatriate footballers in Germany
Swiss expatriate sportspeople in Germany
FC Münsingen players
Sportspeople from the canton of Lucerne